Donald Dewar formed the Dewar government on 13 May 1999 following his appointment as the inaugural First Minister of Scotland. The first devolved executive of Scotland, it consisted of Scottish Labour and the Scottish Liberal Democrats, who formed a coalition on 14 May 1999. The government dissolved and was succeeded by the McLeish government in the aftermath of Dewar's death on 11 October 2000.

Cabinet

May 1999 to October 2000

Changes 

 Lord Hardie unexpectedly resigned from his post as Lord Advocate on 17 February 2000. The post was filled by the then Solicitor General, Colin Boyd, who was in turn replaced by Neil Davidson.

Junior ministers

References

Scottish governments
1999 establishments in Scotland
2000 disestablishments in Scotland
Coalition governments of the United Kingdom
Ministries of Elizabeth II